Bristol Ferry Boats is a brand of water bus services operating around Bristol Harbour in the centre of the English city of Bristol, using a fleet of distinctive yellow-and-blue painted ferry boats. The services were formerly owned by the Bristol Ferry Boat Company, but are now the responsibility of Bristol Community Ferry Boats, a community interest company that acquired the fleet of the previous company.

The company operates scheduled ferry services, along with educational and public boat cruises and private hire of boats. Scheduled services operate on two routes linking Bristol city centre to Temple Meads railway station and Hotwells, serving 17 landing stages throughout the length of the harbour, including one at Brunel's famous SS Great Britain. Services are provided on a commercial basis without subsidy and are subject to competition.

History 

City Docks Ventures, a non-profit making conservation group in Bristol, started the initiative in 1977, with the purchase of the ferry boat Margaret, to be skippered by Ian Bungard. In 1978, Ian Bungard bought Margaret and started to build up the business. In 1980 Margaret was joined by Independence. The ferry service offered all year round leisure, sightseeing, and commuting, as well as private hire, and typified the transformation of Bristol's Floating Harbour from cargo trading vessels to leisure. In 1984 Royal Mail chose an image of Margaret to feature on one of its special edition 'Urban Renewal' stamps; the yellow and blue painted boats had become a well known brand.

In 1992, the company acquired Emily, their first enclosed launch. In 1997 this was joined by Matilda, another enclosed launch and the first vessel purpose built for Bristol Ferry Boats.

In 2002 Ian Bungard sold the business to Rob and Jane Salvidge. From 2002, the company operated additional commuter services to Hotwells and Bristol Temple Meads that were subsidised by, and under contract to, Bristol City Council. In 2004, a cross-harbour shuttle ferry was introduced between SS Great Britain and Capricorn Quay was introduced on the same basis. In 2006, the launch Brigantia joined the fleet, to a design based on that of Matilda. However, in 2007, the contract for the subsidised services was lost to Number Seven Boat Trips, who operated the commuter service until it ceased in 2011 and continue to operate the cross-harbour ferry. Bristol Ferry Boats continued to operate their main commercial services.

In November 2012, the Bristol Ferry Boat Company went into liquidation, with debts of over £10,000 owed to Bristol City Council for navigation and mooring fees, and for office rent. Supporters of the company, including Ian Bungard (the original owner), bought back the fleet at the receivers' auction. In 2013, the campaign to transform the company into community ownership was well oversubscribed. Bristol Community Ferry Boats Limited is the result, now owned by its 871 shareholders from all around Bristol.

Scheduled services 

Bristol Ferry Boats operate 364 days a year, with a single through route linking Temple Meads railway station and Hotwells via Bristol city centre. Services operate every 40 minutes. The following landing stages are served:

Fleet
The fleet of the Bristol Ferry Boats comprises the following vessels:

The Matilda and Brigantia are licensed to operate on the tidal Avon downstream from Bristol through the Avon Gorge to Avonmouth, as well as throughout Bristol Harbour and on the Avon upstream to the city of Bath. The other vessels are restricted to Bristol Harbour and the upstream Avon. Margret is the original yellow and blue ferry boat operating since 1977. She is a true west country survivor.

References

External links 

Bristol Ferry Boats.

Transport in Bristol
Tourist attractions in Bristol
Bristol Harbourside
Ferry transport in England
Ferry companies of England
Water taxis
1977 establishments in England